Qawiña (Aymara for gable, also spelled Kahuiña) is a mountain in the Cordillera Real in the Andes of Bolivia which reaches a height of approximately . It is located in the La Paz Department, Los Andes Province, Batallas Municipality. Qawiña lies southwest of Wari Sipitaña and Wila Wilani.

References 

Mountains of La Paz Department (Bolivia)